Dino Skorup (born 4 October 1999) is a Croatian professional footballer who plays as a midfielder for Šibenik.

Club career
Born in Split, Skorup graduated from the youth academy of Hajduk Split and was promoted to the reserves ahead of the 2018–19 season. In October 2018, however, he received an injury that would sideline him until the end of the season The following season, he was a regular in the reserve squad, playing occasionally in friendly games with the first team.

In the summer of 2020, Skorup was sent on loan to the top-tier NK Varaždin, along with teammate Ivan Delić. Skorup made his Prva HNL debut in a 1-5 home loss against HNK Gorica, coming in the 87th minute for Marko Stolnik.

International career
As of December 2020, Skorup was capped in 5 matches overall for Croatia's U14 and U19 teams.

References

External links
 

1999 births
Living people
Footballers from Split, Croatia
Association football midfielders
Croatian footballers
Croatia youth international footballers
HNK Hajduk Split II players
NK Varaždin (2012) players
HNK Hajduk Split players
NK Hrvatski Dragovoljac players
HNK Šibenik players
Croatian Football League players
First Football League (Croatia) players